Dame Bridget Harris (DCN) (also known as Bridgette Harris) is an Antiguan and Barbudan politician who served as Speaker of the House of Representatives. She was appointed to the position in 1994 as a member of the Antigua and Barbuda Labour Party and served until 2004. She was the first woman to serve as speaker of the house in Antigua and Barbuda. In 2001 she was appointed Dame Commander of the Most Distinguished Order of the Nation.

See also
 List of speakers of the House of Representatives of Antigua and Barbuda

References

Speakers of the House of Representatives (Antigua and Barbuda)
Antigua and Barbuda Labour Party politicians
Antigua and Barbuda women in politics
Year of birth missing (living people)
Living people